The second generation Honda NSX (New Sports eXperience), marketed as the Acura NSX in North America, China and Kuwait, is a two-seater, all-wheel drive, mid-engine hybrid electric sports car developed and manufactured by Honda in the United States. Production began in 2016 and ended in 2022 with the Type-S variant. It succeeds the original NSX that was produced in Japan from 1990 until 2005.

Development

In December 2007, Honda America's CEO, Tetsuo Iwamura, confirmed to the automotive press that a new sports car powered by a V10 engine would make its debut to the market by 2010. The new sports car would be based on the Acura ASCC (Advanced Sports Car Concept) introduced at the 2007 North American International Auto Show. With Honda's CEO Takeo Fukui challenging the developers to make the car faster than the Nissan GT-R around the Nürburgring. Prototypes of the vehicle were seen testing on the Nürburgring in June 2008. On December 17, 2008, Fukui announced during a speech about Honda's revised financial forecasts that, due to poor economic conditions, all plans for a next-generation of the NSX had been cancelled.

In March 2010, the name of the Acura NSX project was changed to the Honda HSV-010 GT, and the car was entered in the Japanese Super GT Championship. The HSV-010 GT never made it into production stage.

In April 2011, Automobile magazine reported that Honda was developing a new sports car to be a successor to the original NSX. The magazine reported that the car would be exhilarating to drive but also environmentally friendly. It was expected that the vehicle will incorporate an electric drivetrain to give the petrol engine a boost of power. In late 2010, Motor Trend reported that Honda was developing a mid-engine hybrid electric sports car to be an NSX successor.

In December 2011, Acura announced that they would unveil the next generation of the NSX in concept form at the 2012 North American International Auto Show. On January 9, 2012, Acura unveiled the 2012 Acura NSX Concept to the general public.

The new concept retained a two-door coupe, mid-engine layout but with all-wheel drive. The use of a high-tech platform made from lightweight materials permitted the weight to be low. Power came from a 3.5-litre V6 engine mounted behind the cockpit, sending its power to the rear wheels. Acura's SH-AWD incorporates one electric motor in a dual-clutch transmission to augment the combustion engine thus forming a hybrid setup. Additionally, two more electric motors able to instantly send negative or positive torque to the front wheels during cornering also formed part of the powertrain.

Acura claimed the resulting all-wheel drive system would provide better handling and matching acceleration while offering greater efficiency relative to the naturally aspirated 4.5-litre V8 engine in the Ferrari 458, the NSX's main competitor at the time.

Official launch and production

Announcements
On December 27, 2014, Honda announced that the second-generation of the NSX flagship sports car would debut at the 2015 North American International Auto Show on January 12, 2015.

Debut
The Honda NSX unveiled at the 2015 North American International Auto Show. Honda to begin orders for the NSX on summer 2015, and deliveries on late 2015.

At the same time, Honda announced the European debut for the NSX at the 85th Geneva Motor Show, alongside the FK2 Civic Type R.

The first production vehicle with VIN #001 was auctioned off by Barrett Jackson on January 29, 2016. NASCAR team owner Rick Hendrick won the auction with a bid for  million. The entire proceeds from the auction were donated to the charities Pediatric Brain Tumor Foundation and Camp Southern Ground. The first NSX rolled off the production line in Ohio on May 24, 2016.

Production of the second generation NSX commenced in 2015 at the Performance Manufacturing Center (PMC). The facility is specifically built for the assembly of the NSX, and it cost US$70 million to build the assembly plant for Honda. It is located in Marysville, Ohio, which is housed inside Honda's former North American Logistics facility and located in the midst of Honda's existing R&D and production engineering operations. The powertrain is separately assembled by Honda associates at its engine plant in Anna, Ohio. In February, 2017, Honda offered a factory tour exclusively for the 2017 through 2022 model year, U.S. market NSX buyers, called "NSX Insider Experience". The tour features the NSX assembly at the Performance Manufacturing Center (PMC), museum visit at Honda Heritage Center and racetrack driving at Honda's test track. Also, owners of the non-delivered NSX can track their own NSX being assembled, tested and to place the Acura badge on the just assembled NSX. This factory tour offered with packages starting at US$2,000 through up to $6,000 and each participant will be guided by an Acura host in an Acura MDX.

Discontinuation
In 2020, Honda stopped producing the NSX for Japan, Australia and Europe including the United Kingdom due to its poor sales, and announced that it is no longer available in the respective areas for sale. In 2019 and 2020, the NSX had sold only 3 units, and none in Australia. Also, in Japan, only 9 units were sold in January 2020.  At the end of 2021, Honda stopped producing the NSX for all other markets and stated that only a limited run Type S variant will be produced in 2022. Honda has sold 2,908 units worldwide (including Type S models).

Dimensions
The table below indicates the change in dimensions, relative to the original second generation concept car presented in 2012:

Specifications

Engine and powertrain
Mechanically, the second generation of the NSX represents a significant departure from the first generation since it features a hybrid electric powertrain. The engine also includes a dry sump oil system and the turbochargers can produce boost up to 15.2 PSI, mated to a three electric motor Sport Hybrid SH-AWD system, a 1.3 kWh lithium-ion battery, and a 9-speed dual-clutch transmission (DCT).

Chassis and body
The car has first generation NSX inspired LED headlights, turn signals and taillights, optional dry carbon-fiber rear spoiler, front splitter, rear defuser, side skirts, carbon-fiber roof, over 10 radiators and various amount of vents all over the exterior to improve downforce and cooling. Structurally, the body utilizes a space frame design, which is made from aluminium, ultra-high strength steel, and other rigid and lightweight materials, some of which are the world's first applications.

Suspension, brakes and tires

The NSX offered with all-aluminum suspension bits, double-wishbone suspension setup for front and multi-link suspension setup for rear.

Brakes are made up of 6-piston on front and 4-piston on rear with monoblock calipers on steel brake rotors and optional carbon-ceramic brake rotors.

The NSX also offered with 19x8.5 inch front and 20x11 inch rear aluminum wheels, with Continental ContiSportContact tires and optional Pirelli P Zero Trofeo R tires with sizes of 245/35Z R19 on front and 295/30Z R20 on rear.

Performance

In a test conducted by Car and Driver, the NSX accelerated from 0 to 60 mph (97 km/h) in 3.1 seconds and completed the quarter-mile run in 11.2 seconds at 126 mph (203 km/h). 

In September 2021, Acura conducted a test for the NSX Type S around the Grand Prix of Long Beach street circuit with IMSA SportsCar champion Ricky Taylor driving. He set a lap time of 1:32.784 minutes, which was nearly three seconds faster than the 2019 NSX's 1:35.663 minute lap time set by Peter Cunningham and the lap record for a road-legal production vehicles.

2019 update

In August 2018, Honda announced improvements for the 2019 model year. The improvements included larger front and rear stabilizer bars, which increased front stiffness by 26 percent and rear stiffness by 19 percent, as well as 21 percent stiffer rear toe link bushings. New specially developed Continental tires and optional Pirelli P Zero Trofeo R tires were also included. These led to software optimizations to the Sport Hybrid SH-AWD system, active magnetorheological dampers, electric power steering and VSA settings. According to Honda, the car is 1.9 seconds faster than the pre-2019 model around the Suzuka Circuit. Visually, the car's previously silver front grille garnish is now painted in the same color as the body. Additionally, a new Thermal Orange Pearl body color became available for 2019, followed by Indy Yellow Pearl for 2020 and Long Beach Blue Pearl for 2021.

NSX Type S (2022)
On August 3, 2021, Honda teased the NSX Type S via its YouTube channel. Claimed it will be an improved, high-performance version of the NSX and it will be only produced in 2022 to mark the car's final year of production. The NSX Type S will be limited to 350 units worldwide, with 300 of these units available for the United States, 30 for Japan and 15 for Canada, will not be available for Europe and the United Kingdom. The Type S moniker was last used in the NSX on the 1997 NSX Type S and Type S-Zero models that were exclusive for the Japanese domestic market, meaning that the 2022 version will be the first NSX Type S to be sold out of Japan. The car was unveiled to the public on August 12, 2021, at the Monterey Car Week in the United States, and on August 30 in Japan.

The gear ratio of the Twin Motor Unit powering the front wheels was lowered by 20 percent to improve torque off the line and give the car a quicker launch, while the car's usable battery capacity and battery output have been increased by 20 and 10 percent, respectively, as a result of more efficient usage of the car's Intelligent Power Unit. Because of the improvements in battery capacity and output, the car's electric motors have been retuned to offer better performance and a higher electric-only range. The car's 9-speed dual-clutch transmission (DCT) also features improvements. New programming for Sport and Sport+ modes resulted in 50 percent faster upshifts, while the allowable downshift speed in Track mode was raised by 1,500 rpm to allow earlier downshifts. A new "Rapid Downshift Mode" was introduced, allowing the driver to shift to the lowest possible gear according to the car's speed by holding the downshift paddle for 0.6 seconds in Sport, Sport+ and Track modes. In fully automatic mode, the transmission downshifts earlier in Sport+ and Track modes.

The Type S features several new design elements to improve downforce and cooling through enhanced aerodynamics. These include a new nose design and a large carbon-fiber rear diffuser based on the one used on the NSX GT3 Evo. Honda also optimized the car's chassis, suspension and response, re-tuned its four drive modes, and refined its engine note. Also, black Honda and Acura badging offered exclusively for the NSX Type S just like other Type S models. As an optional feature, a "Lightweight Package" was introduced, reducing 26 kg (58 lb) from the car's curb weight with carbon ceramic brakes, carbon fiber engine cover and carbon fiber interior parts. Also, a new exclusive body paint color, named "Gotham Gray Matte" on North American models and "Carbon Matte Gray Metallic" on Japanese models, was offered, which is limited for 70 vehicles. 

With all of these upgrades, Honda states that the NSX Type S can accelerate 0 to 60 mph in under 3 seconds, electronically limited top speed remains at 307 km/h (191 mph) and two seconds faster at the Suzuka Circuit than the 2019–2021 NSX, meaning that the Type S is four seconds faster than the original 2016–2018 model at Suzuka. In May 2022, Car and Driver conducted a performance test for the NSX Type S, the car was 0.2 seconds quicker than the standard NSX, as it accelerated from 0 to 60 mph (97 km/h) in 2.9 seconds, and completed the quarter-mile run in 11.0 seconds at 126 mph (203 km/h).

On August 14, 2021, the first NSX Type S – VIN #001 out of 350 – was auctioned to Rick Hendrick (same buyer of the first production NSX, which was auctioned back in 2016) for US$1.1 million at Mecum's Daytime Auction, which was held during the Monterey Car Week. All proceeds were donated to charitable organizations, including the Center of Science and Industry (COSI). All 300 Type S models in the United States were reserved with deposits within 24 hours of the car's launch, with a waiting list that includes more than 100 people. Applications for purchase in Japan began on 2 September 2021, with Japanese deliveries beginning in July 2022. Production of the NSX Type S began in January 2022. North American deliveries began in February 2022. Also, Acura Canada and Make-A-Wish Foundation held an online private auction for the first Type S out of 15 reserved Canadian Type S vehicles. The car led to a bid of US$306,364.90, won by Luc Girard and Geneviève Hardy. This was the largest, one-time, single donation the Make-A-Wish ever received. All of the proceeds were led to help children with critical illnesses.

Awards and recognition

Road & Track named the NSX as its 2017 Performance Car of the Year.  The magazine lauded the NSX for its use of hybrid technology in the service of an emotional driving experience.  The NSX also won the AutoGuide.com Readers' Choice Car of the Year Award for achieving high performance with a natural driving feel.  The NSX was the Business Insider 2016 Car of the Year on the strength of its striking styling and its unique drivetrain for a car in its price range.  The Green Car Journal 2017 Luxury Green Car of the Year award went to the NSX for its combination of performance and efficiency.  Automobile staff voted the NSX to its list of 2017 All-Stars; the car won the honor "by consistently putting a grin on drivers' faces" during testing. Motor Trend awarded the NSX first place in its 2020 hybrid performance car comparison, praising the improvements made to the car by the 2019 update. Autocar listed the Honda NSX as one of the best super sports cars for the year 2022.

Marketing
In September 2011, during filming of The Avengers, Robert Downey, Jr. (playing the role of Iron Man) was spotted in an exotic sports car similar to the new NSX, made specifically for the film, rather than the Audi R8 he previously drove in Iron Man and Iron Man 2. The car itself was built by Trans FX using an existing 1992 NSX. Its design was an altered form of the new NSX's final design in order to avoid leaks and speculations about the new sports car by the media. Also, it is currently owned by Robert Downey Jr.

A Super Bowl advertisement for the vehicle began airing in early February 2012, featuring Jerry Seinfeld and Jay Leno.

In 2013, Acura launched an online configuration tool for the new NSX on Facebook. Later that year, the car was featured in the video game Gran Turismo 6.

Although the original name was retained—which stood for "New Sportscar eXperimental"—the second generation model's name has been defined as "New Sports eXperience".

Motorsports

Super GT

The NSX Concept-GT, a race car based on the NSX concept, was unveiled in 2013 to race in the GT500 category of the Super GT Series from 2014. During the 2014 season, the NSX Concept-GT received its first pole and victory at Fuji Speedway in August, with the best-placed Honda driver fourth in the championship. In 2015, the car won at Sportsland Sugo and finished third in the championship. The car featured a hybrid system in 2014 and 2015, but it was abandoned for the 2016 season, with hybrid systems banned from GT500 in 2017. The 2016 season saw the car score a pole position in Suzuka and three podiums.

In 2017, Honda launched the NSX-GT based on the production version, replacing the NSX Concept-GT. The car won the final running of the Suzuka 1000km in 2017, and in 2018, it won the championship with Jenson Button and Naoki Yamamoto of Team Kunimitsu crowned champions. In an incident-filled 2019, the car won the Okayama round and the second Super GT × DTM Dream Race, which was the mid-engine NSX's final race. Due to regulation changes in accordance with Class One Touring Cars regulations, Honda debuted new NSX-GT with a front-engine layout for the 2020 season. Team Kunimitsu's NSX would narrowly won the GT500 title in an upset after the rival KeePer Toyota GR Supra ran out of fuel at the end of the final lap of the championship race at Fuji Speedway.

At Mobility Resort Motegi during the pre-season testing for the 2022 season, Honda was spied testing new NSX-GT race cars which were based on the NSX Type S. In February 2022, the NSX-GT Type S made its public debut at the Honda Racing "Thanks Day" racing festival at Suzuka Circuit. 

On the opening round at Okayama International Circuit, Team Kunimitsu's NSX-GT Type S qualified 3rd on the grid. On the race day the car finished 2nd overall, driven by Naoki Yamamoto and Tadasuke Makino. On the second round at Fuji Speedway, the car scored its first win with team Autobacs Racing Team Aguri (ARTA). Nirei Fukuzumi and Tomoki Nojiri were the drivers who won the round. On the third round at Suzuka International Racing Course, team Astemo Real Racing's #17 car scored another podium by finishing the race in 2nd, driven by Nobuharu Matsushita and Koudai Tsukakoshi, the team also was in fight with two other Nissan Z GT500 drivers for the championship heading onto the last race. The car managed to win the championship decider starting from pole position, but failed to win the championship, ended the season 3rd in standings.

GT3

At the 2016 New York International Auto Show, Honda announced the GT3 version of the NSX, to begin competition in 2017. During its first season of racing in 2017, the NSX GT3 scored its first race victory in the IMSA SportsCar Championship GTD class at Belle Isle, followed by another win at the following round of the championship, the 6 Hours of Watkins Glen. It also won the Utah round of the Pirelli World Challenge. For the following year in 2018, the car finished second in the IMSA GTD championship with two wins. It made its debut in the Japanese Super GT Series, scoring a podium in Autopolis. The car also made its debut at the 24 Hours of Spa, finishing the 24-hour race seventh in the Pro-Am class.

Honda introduced an upgraded version of the car, the NSX GT3 Evo, for 2019. Its upgrades include improved aerodynamics and cooling, as well as new turbochargers. The car had a successful debut year, winning the 2019 IMSA SportsCar Championship GTD drivers' and teams' titles, as well as the 2019 Super GT drivers' and teams' titles in the GT300 class. The NSX GT3 Evo successfully defended its IMSA titles in 2020, winning back-to-back drivers' and teams' titles, as well as the manufacturers' championship. The car has also won several championships in SRO's GT World Challenge America, having won pro-am drivers' and teams' titles in 2019, and overall manufacturers', drivers' and teams' titles in 2020. In the Intercontinental GT Challenge, the car scored two pole positions, a podium at the 2020 Indianapolis 8 Hours, an overall top-six finish at the 2019 24 Hours of Spa, and dominated the 2020 Kyalami 9 Hours until heavy rain shuffled the order with an hour remaining. Other successes for the car include winning the 2019 Blancpain GT Sports Club title and race wins in the Italian GT Championship and International GT Open. the NSX GT3 and NSX GT3 Evo have won 25 class wins in both IMSA SportsCar Championship and SRO's GT World Challenge America.

After an unsuccessful year in 2021 IMSA SportsCar Championship, Honda Performance Development introduced another upgraded version of the car for 2022, the NSX GT3 Evo22. The upgrades include improved intercoolers, re-tuned suspension, new wheel system revisions, optional headlight variants along with FIA-mandated rain lights and air conditioning system. Production of the NSX GT3 Evo22 is handled by JAS Motorsport using chassis resources from Marysville, Ohio plant. The car is expected to compete in racing globally until 2024.  The upgraded NSX GT3 Evo22 made its debut at 2022 Super GT season's Okayama round. Team UpGarage's #18 car, driven by Kakunoshin Ohta qualified 4th on the grid. On the race day, the car able to finish 2nd behind Kondo Racing's Nissan GT-R Nismo GT3. The season wasn't that successful, as the car only managed another podium finish at the fourth round at Fuji Speedway, 11th in standings. But in 2022 GT World Challenge America, the car proved to be successful, as team Racers Edge Motorsports NSX GT3 Evo22 won the Pro-Am championship with drivers, Mario Farnbacher and Ashton Harrison. The car scored 4 in class race wins, 4 pole positions, 2 fastest laps and 9 podium finishes during the season.

Sales 

The Honda NSX have been sold 2,908 units worldwide (including 350 units of Type S models).

From a total of 350 Type S units, VIN#001—#300 were destinated for deliveries in the United States with 50 of them were painted in Gotham Grey body color, VIN#301—#330 were scheduled for deliveries in Japan with 15 of them in Gotham Grey, VIN#331—#345 delivered to Canada with 5 Gotham Grey vehicles and VIN#346—350 deliveries were currently unknown.

European sales statistics are from the following countries: Austria, Belgium, Cyprus, Czech Republic, Denmark, Estonia, Finland, France, Germany, Great Britain, Greece, Hungary, Iceland, Ireland, Italy, Latvia, Lithuania, Luxembourg, Netherlands, Norway, Poland, Portugal, Romania, Slovakia, Slovenia, Spain, Sweden, Switzerland.

Replacement
On August 23, 2021, at the Monterey Car Week, Acura's Vice President and Brand Officer Jon Ikeda said in an interview with The Drive that the second generation NSX will be succeeded by a next-generation model, stating, "If you notice, we make an NSX when there's something we want to say. The first-gen was gas. Second-gen was a hybrid. There's gonna be another one." Ikeda hinted that the successor will be powered by an all-electric powertrain.

References

External links 
Honda NSX official website (Japan)
Acura NSX official website

Sports cars
Rear mid-engine, all-wheel-drive vehicles
Cars introduced in 2015
NSX (second generation)
Coupés
Hybrid electric cars
Motor vehicles manufactured in the United States